Jim Robison was an English-born Australian professional soccer player who played as a goalkeeper. He was also an international player for the Australia national soccer team.

Robison was capped once with Australia in 1924 against Canada.

International career
Robison played his first and only international match for Australia on 14 June 1924 in a 0–1 loss to Canada.

Career statistics

International

References

Australian soccer players
Association football goalkeepers
Australia international soccer players
Year of birth missing
Year of death missing